Lefa Mosena (born 18 March 1987) is a South African first-class cricketer. He was included in the KZN Inland squad for the 2015 Africa T20 Cup.

References

External links
 

1987 births
Living people
South African cricketers
KwaZulu-Natal Inland cricketers
Cricketers from Bloemfontein
Wicket-keepers